Shetfal Dam, is an earthfill dam on Shetfal river near Indapur, Pune district in the state of Maharashtra in India.

Specifications

Purpose
 Irrigation

See also
 Dams in Maharashtra
 List of reservoirs and dams in India

References

Dams in Pune district
Dams completed in 1901
1901 establishments in India
20th-century architecture in India